The Book of the 24 Philosophers is a philosophical and theological medieval text of uncertain authorship.

Overview
The book consists of twenty-four "sentences", "aphorisms" or "definitions" of God, attributed to as many philosophers attending a fictional gathering, each an attempt to answer their only remaining question, "what is God?". The first textual witness is from a 12th-century French manuscript currently at Laon. The definitions were often accompanied by a scholastic commentary in either of two redactions, the "shorter" and the "longer" commentary. Both definitions and commentary echo and weave numerous late ancient and medieval views on the first cause and the nature of divinity.

During the Middle Ages, the Liber was variously attributed to Hermes Trismegistus,  Aristotle or simply quoted anonymously by theologians and philosophers. Contemporary scholarship is still inconclusive about the origin and authorship of the text. French scholar Françoise Hudry has argued for the attribution to Marius Victorinus (fl. 4th century). According to others, the text would belong to a lost work by Aristotle, the De philosophia, known to medieval Europe through the Arab translators of the Toledo School.

There are notably German, French and Italian studies of the text available, with no English translation yet in print, although online editions exist.

Influence
The influence of this work on medieval scholarship and literature has revealed traces of its ideas among the works of Jean de Meung, Dante, Meister Eckhart, Nicholas of Cusa, Giordano Bruno, Martin Luther, Robert Fludd, Pascal, and Leibniz.

The second definition in particular gained wide currency from early on in the High Middle Ages: “God is an infinite sphere whose centre is everywhere and whose circumference is nowhere”.

References

Bibliography

 Baeumker, Clemens, "", in Clemens Baeumker (ed.), Freiburg am Breisgau, 1913, pp. 17–40.
 Baeumker, Clemens, "", in Clemens Baeumker, von Martin Grabmann editor, Münster, 1927, pp. 194–214 (revised and corrected edition).
 D'Alverny, Marie-Therèse, “”,  (1949).
 Flasch, Kurt, Verlag C.H. Beck, München, 2011.
 Follon, Jacques, “”, Persée, vol. 87, no. 74, 1989, pp. 359–363.
 Hudry, Françoise (ed.),  (Latin text and French translation), Millon, Grenoble, 1989.
 Hudry, Françoise (ed.),, Turnhout, 1997.
 Hudry, Françoise (ed.), Marius Victorinus, . . Paris: Librairie Philosophique J. Vrin, 2009.
 Lucentini, Paolo (ed.), Adelphi, Milano, 1999.
 Lucentini, Paolo, “”, in Marenbon, John (ed.), Poetry and Philosophy in the Middle Ages: A Festschrift for Peter Dronke, Brill, 2001.

12th-century Latin books
Anonymous works
Christian theology books
Hermeticism
Medieval philosophical literature
Neoplatonic texts
Scholasticism

External Links
 

Works of unknown authorship